Colonial Airlines was a Montreal-based carrier formed in 1942 from the reformation of Canadian Colonial Airways.  In 1956, Eastern Air Lines purchased the airline.

Destinations

Albany, New York
Allentown, Pennsylvania
Baltimore, Maryland
Bermuda
Binghamton, New York
Burlington, Vermont
Glens Falls, New York
Lake Placid, New York
Lancaster, Pennsylvania
Malone, New York
Massena, New York
Montreal, Quebec, Canada
Newark, New Jersey
Ottawa, Ontario, Canada
Philadelphia, Pennsylvania
Plattsburgh, New York
Poughkeepsie, New York
Reading, Pennsylvania
Rutland, New York
Schenectady, New York
Syracuse, New York
Washington, D.C.
Watertown, New York
Wilkes-Barre, Pennsylvania

References

Defunct airlines of Canada
Airlines established in 1942
Airlines disestablished in 1956
1942 establishments in Quebec
1956 disestablishments in Quebec
1956 mergers and acquisitions